Mallasamudram was one of the 206 constituencies in the Tamil Nadu Legislative Assembly of Tamil Nadu a southern state of India. It was in Namakkal district and it was also part of Namakkal (Lok Sabha constituency).

Members of Legislative Assembly

Election results

1962

References

External links
 

Namakkal district
Former assembly constituencies of Tamil Nadu